The S. H. Kress and Co. Building, or simply the Kress Building, is located at 705 Main Street in Houston, Texas. It was listed on the National Register of Historic Places on October 4, 2002.

The eight-story building is covered almost entirely in terra cotta. A 1983 renovation removed the Kress signage and other architectural features of its retail past, but the building retains the character of a 1913 skyscraper, one of several built in downtown Houston at the time. This S. H. Kress & Co. building was one of the largest the company built, and one of the few to incorporate professional offices.

See also
 National Register of Historic Places listings in Harris County, Texas

References

Buildings and structures in Houston
Commercial buildings on the National Register of Historic Places in Texas
National Register of Historic Places in Houston